Cala Sant Vicenç may refer to

Cala Sant Vicenç / Cala de Sant Vicent, Majorca
Cala Sant Vicenç / Cala de Sant Vicent, Ibiza